Once Upon a Star is the second studio album by the Bay City Rollers. Released in May 1975, the album features the UK number-one hit single, "Bye Bye Baby".  

Originally issued as a non-album single in 1971, "Keep on Dancing" was included as a track on this LP.

Track listing

Side one
"Bye Bye Baby" (Bob Crewe, Bob Gaudio) – 2:50
"The Disco Kid" (Eric Faulkner, Stuart Wood) – 3:16
"La Belle Jeane" (Faulkner, Wood) – 4:01
"When Will You Be Mine" (Johnny Goodison, Phil Wainman) – 2:32
"Angel Baby" (Faulkner, Wood) – 3:52
"Keep on Dancing" (Allen Jones, Willie David Young) – 2:42

Side two
"Once Upon a Star" (Faulkner, Wood) – 3:00
"Let's Go (A Huggin' and a Kissin' in the Moonlight)" (Goodison, Wainman) – 3:28
"Marlina" (Faulkner, Les McKeown, Wood) – 3:01
"My Teenage Heart" (Faulkner, Wood) – 2:31
"Rock & Roll Honeymoon" (Goodison, Wainman) – 2:45
"Hey! Beautiful Dreamer" (Faulkner, McKeown, Wood) – 3:49

2004 UK reissue
A 2004 CD reissue on Bell included five bonus tracks: "All of Me Loves All of You" (1974 single), "The Bump" (B-side), "Keep on Dancing" (1971 single version), "Alright" and "It's for You".

Personnel

Group members
Les McKeown – lead vocals
Eric Faulkner – acoustic and electric guitars, backing vocals, mandolin, violin
Stuart "Woody" Wood – acoustic and electric guitars, backing vocals, piano, bass
Alan Longmuir – bass, backing vocals, accordion
Derek Longmuir – drums

Other personnel
Colin Frechter - musical director, piano and additional backing vocals
Melvyn Abrahams – engineering
Barry Hammond – engineering
John Pasche – cover design
Nick Ryan – engineering
Peter Tattersall – engineering
Phil Wainman – production

Charts

Weekly charts

Year-end charts

Certifications and sales

References

Bay City Rollers albums
1975 albums
Albums produced by Phil Wainman
Bell Records albums
Albums recorded at IBC Studios